This is a list of mayors and chairmen of the City of Collingwood, a former local government area in  Melbourne, Victoria, Australia and its precedents. It existed from 1855 until 1994 when it merged with the City of Fitzroy and City of Richmond to form the new City of Yarra.

Council name

Chairmen (1855–1876)

Mayor (1876–1994)

City of Yarra mayors (from 1996)

See also
 List of mayors of Fitzroy
 List of mayors of Richmond

External links
 Yarra City Council

References
 Collingwood Mayors
 Australian Dictionary of Biography Online

Collingwood
Mayors Collingwood